Thomas B. O'Connell (September 26, 1930 – March 20, 2014) was an American collegiate and professional football quarterback who played in the National Football League (NFL) for three seasons. He played in 1953 for the Chicago Bears and in 1956 and 1957 for the Cleveland Browns. O'Connell also played in two American Football League (AFL) seasons, 1960 and 1961, for the Buffalo Bills.  He attended the University of Illinois at Urbana-Champaign, Class of 1953, where he was a member of the Chi Phi Fraternity.

He started for the Cleveland Browns in the 1957 NFL Championship Game while coming off a severely sprained ankle and a hairline fracture of the fibula. He retired from football after the 1957 season to go into coaching, but was lured back to the playing field when the American Football League started play in 1960. He is the father of former professional ice hockey player and general manager Mike O'Connell. He died March 20, 2014, aged 83.

Professional career
O'Connell played backup duty in his rookie year of 1953, having 67 total passes that year in relief. He returned in 1956 to play with the Browns, and he went 3-2 as a starter while throwing four touchdowns to eight interceptions with 551 yards. The next year, he emerged as the Browns quarterback in 1956 following the retirement of Hall of Fame quarterback Otto Graham.  In 1957, he was selected to the Pro Bowl and won seven of the eight games he started, leading the Browns to the Eastern Conference title.  His performance that year was stellar. In nine games as the starter, he won seven of them while throwing nine touchdowns to eight interceptions while passing for 1,229 yards. He retired after the year only to return to football in 1960. He played for the Buffalo Bills in 1960 and 1961 and started seven combined games (winning just once), throwing seven touchdowns to fourteen interceptions before retiring again.

Coaching career
O'Connell was the 18th head football coach at Drake University in Des Moines, Iowa and he held that position for the 1959 season. His coaching record at Drake was 2–7. O'Connell died in 2014.

Head coaching record

See also
 List of American Football League players

References

External links
 

1930 births
2014 deaths
American football quarterbacks
American Football League players
Buffalo Bills players
Chicago Bears players
Cleveland Browns players
Drake Bulldogs football coaches
Eastern Conference Pro Bowl players
Illinois Fighting Illini football players
Sportspeople from Chicago
Players of American football from Chicago